The Chicago Talent Development High School was a public school in Chicago, Illinois. It was established in 2009, and closed at the end of the 2013–14 academic year.

References 

2009 establishments in Illinois
2014 disestablishments in Illinois
Educational institutions established in 2009
Educational institutions disestablished in 2014
Former high schools in Illinois
Public high schools in Chicago